Holealur also spelled as Holealooru is a village in the Ron taluk of Gadag district in the Indian state of Karnataka.

Demographics
 India census, Holealur had a population of 7898 with 4092 males and 3806 females.

Importance
Holealur is famous for the wooden handicrafts.

Educational Institutes in Holealur 

 Shri Kalmeshwara Vidya Prasaraka Samiti.
 Shri Yachareshwara Balavikasa Vidya Mandira.
 Sanjay High School.
 Govt. Primary School.
 Jnanasindhu Residential School (For The Visually Challenged).

Notable People from Holealur 

 Shri Aluru Venkataraya
 Shri R. S. Mugali

Karnataka Ekikarana Movement 
Main article: Shri Aluru Venkataraya

Shri Aluru Venkataraya from Holealur is revered as Karnataka Kulapurohita (High priest of the Kannada family) in the Karnataka region for his contribution towards the cause of a separate Karnataka state. He became famous for undertaking a Karnataka Ekikarana movement in support of the formation of a state for the Kannada-speaking population of Mysore, Bombay Presidency and the Nizam's Hyderabad.

Distance to Major Cities 
Holealur to,

Ron - 18 km

Badami - 22 km

Konnur - 24 km

Gadag district - 57 km (By Road) and 49 km (By Railways)

Bagalkote District - 63 km (By Road) and km (By Railways)

Huballi - 79 km (By Road) and 108 km (By Railways)

See also
 Gadag
 Districts of Karnataka

References

External links
 http://Gadag.nic.in/

Villages in Gadag district